Chetana is an Indian theatre group based on Kolkata, West Bengal. It was founded on November 22, 1972 by Arun Mukherjee.

History
On November 22, 1972, Arun Mukherjee, along with his colleagues, formed Chetana. It has produced approximately 30 full length plays and 15 short plays. Its major productions include: Mareech Sambad, Jagannath, Tista Parer brittanta, Mephisto.

Chetana has performed in Europe, North America, Bangladesh, and many major cities in India. On its European tours in 2004, it participated in the Ibsen Stage Festival in Oslo; it has also performed in London.

Plays
2020 !Girgiti
2020 !Kusum Kusum
!Magan rajar pala

References

External links

Bengali theatre groups
1972 establishments in West Bengal
Organizations established in 1972